Huaminglou is a rural town in Ningxiang City, Hunan Province, China.

Administrative division
The Town is divided into eight villages and one community, the following areas: 
 Liu Family Community
 Tanzichong
 Huaminglou
 Zhushiqiao
 Jinjiang
 Jinyuan
 Lianxinqiao
 Changshan
 Yanglinqiao

History
In 2019, the Changsha Municipal Government decided to build it into a "Red Cultural Tourism Town".

Geography
The Jin River flows through the town.

Economy
The region abounds with refractory clay.

Education
There is one senior high school located with the town limits: Ningxiang No.4 High School.There are two junior high schools and six primary schools located with the town.

Culture
Huaguxi is the most influence local theater.

Transportation

Provincial Highway
The Provincial Highway S219 runs east and intersects with S50 Changsha-Shaoshan-Loudi Expressway and G0421 Xuchang–Guangzhou Expressway.

Expressway
The Changsha-Shaoshan-Loudi Expressway, which runs east through Daolin Town to Yuelu District, Changsha, and the west through Donghutang Town, Jinshi Town, Huitang Town, Jinsou Township, Yueshan Town, Hutian Town to Louxing District, Loudi.

The northern terminus of Shaoshan Expressway is at the town.

County Road
The County Road X087 runs northwest to Donghutang Town and runs east to Daolin Town.

The County Road X085 runs north and intersects with Yue-Ning Avenue.

The County Road X217 runs southeast to Datunying Town.

The County Road X090 runs southwest to Sanxian'ao Township.

Attractions
The Former Residence of Liu Shaoqi is a famous scenic spot. It was originally built in late Qing dynasty (1644–1911).

Celebrity

Tao Runai, scholar.
Tao Lidian, scholar.
Wang Tanxiu, scholar.
Yuan Mingyao, scholar.
Zhu Yidian, general.
Chen Jiading, revolutionist.
Zhou Wen, sculptor.
Yang Shichao, artist.
Yang Peizhen, artist.
Liu Shaoqi, politician.

References

External links

Divisions of Ningxiang
Ningxiang
Liu Shaoqi